Burevestnik is a Russian name for the petrel, popularized by Maxim Gorky's 1901 poem "The Song of the Stormy Petrel".

Burevestnik may refer to:

Newspapers
Burevestnik (1906), a Russian anarchist newspaper published in Paris
Burevestnik (Minsk, 1917), a newspaper published daily from Minsk, Belarus
Burevestnik (Petrograd, 1917), a Russian anarchist newspaper
Burevestnik (Tiflis, 1917), a Russian language Bolshevik newspaper published from Tbilisi, Georgia
Burevestnik (1920), a Russian language anarchist periodical issued from Odessa, Ukraine
Burevestnik (1921), a Russian language anarchist periodical published in New York City

Other uses
Burevestnik (Nizhny Novgorod Metro), a station of the Nizhny Novgorod Metro
Burevestnik (sports society), a voluntary sports society of students and teachers in the USSR
Burevestnik (Ukraine), its branch in the Ukrainian SSR
Burevestnik Airport, a military air base on the Kuril Islands, Russia
JSC CRI Burevestnik Central Scientific Research Institute, a Russian arms industry company based in Nizhny Novgorod
Burevestnik Cinema, a building in Rostov-on-Don, Russia
Burevestnik Glacier, a glacier on Pasteur Peninsula, Antarctica
Before the Hurricane or Burevestnik, a 1924 Georgian film
9M730 Burevestnik, a Russian nuclear-powered nuclear-armed cruise missile
Russian submarine Burevestnik, a 1915 Bars class submarine of the Imperial Russian Navy
Burevestnik-class frigate, a ship class of the Russian Navy
Burevestnik-24, a Russian experimental civil piston ground-effect vehicle (GEV).